K. N. Lakshmanan (October 20, 1930 – June 1, 2020) was an Indian politician. He was a member of the Tamil Nadu legislative assembly elected from Mylapore constituency as a Bharatiya Janata Party candidate in 2001. He died on 1 June 2020 due to old age in Salem, Tamil Nadu. He was the President of Tamil Nadu BJP twice.

References 

1930 births
2020 deaths
Bharatiya Janata Party politicians from Tamil Nadu
Place of birth missing